Anticurialism refers to a juridical and philosophical line of thought that conglomerates a group of theories and political positions which appeared in Naples after the Council of Trent and which lasted until the modern day and led to the suppression of the feudal, juridical, and  fiscal privileges of the clergy.

Further reading
AA.VV., Riformatori napoletani, a cura di F. Venturini. Classici Ricciardi, tomo III, 1962.
De Giovanni G., Il Giansenismo a Napoli nel sec. XVIII, Asprenas I, 1954.
Giannone P., Storia civile del Regno di Napoli, 1723.
Croce B., Storia del Regno di Napoli, Adelphi ed., Milano 1992

See also
Kingdom of Naples
Monarchism
Jurisdictionalism
Jansenism

Canon law history
Political ideologies
History of Christianity in Italy